Harry Wells VC (19 September 1888 – 25 September 1915) was an English recipient of the Victoria Cross, the highest and most prestigious award for gallantry in the face of the enemy that can be awarded to British and Commonwealth forces.

Details
Wells was 27 years old, and a sergeant in the 2nd Battalion, The Royal Sussex Regiment, British Army during the First World War when the following deed took place for which he was awarded the VC.

On 25 September 1915 near Le Rutoire, Loos, France, when the platoon officer had been killed, Sergeant Wells took command and led his men forward to within 15 yards of the German wire. Nearly half the platoon were killed or wounded and the remainder were much shaken but Sergeant Wells rallied them and led them on. Finally, when very few were left, he stood up and urged them forward once again and while doing this he was killed.

Further information

Wells is buried in Dud Corner Cemetery, Le Rutoire, near Loos. 2 miles NW of Lens. Plot V, Row E, Grave 2.

The medal
His Victoria Cross is displayed at the Eastbourne Redoubt Museum, Eastbourne, Sussex, England.

References

Monuments to Courage (David Harvey, 1999)
The Register of the Victoria Cross (This England, 1997)
VCs of the First World War: The Western Front 1915 (Peter F. Batchelor & Christopher Matson, 1999)

External links
Redoubt Fortress Museum 
Eastbourne Redoubt
Profile

1888 births
1915 deaths
People from Herne Bay, Kent
Royal Sussex Regiment soldiers
British Army personnel of World War I
British World War I recipients of the Victoria Cross
British military personnel killed in World War I
British police officers
British Army recipients of the Victoria Cross
Military personnel from Kent
Burials in Hauts-de-France